Commander, Naval Surface Force, Atlantic (COMNAVSURFLANT) is a post within the United States Fleet Forces Command. As Naval Surface Force Atlantic, it is a military formation, but the organization is often known as SURFLANT. Its headquarters are at the Naval Station Norfolk, Norfolk, Virginia. The current commander is Rear Admiral Brendan R. McLane. COMNAVSURFLANT supervises all surface ships based on the Eastern United States and Gulf Coast of the United States, as well as ships forwarded deployed to Naval Station Rota, Spain.

Overview
Naval Surface Force Atlantic is one of the U.S. Navy type commands. It consists of more than 70 ships, 25 separate organizations, and 25,000 personnel. The command was created on 1 July 1975 by the consolidation of the previous Commander, Amphibious Forces, Atlantic Fleet (COMPHIBLANT), Commander, Cruiser-Destroyer Forces, Atlantic Fleet (COMCRUDESLANT), Commander, Service Forces, Atlantic Fleet (COMSERVLANT), and Commander, Minesweeping Force, Atlantic Fleet.

The Destroyer Force, Atlantic Fleet, was established after the First World War. The Force was redesignated as Destroyer Squadron, Atlantic, on October 1, 1921; later to be redesignated again as Destroyer Squadron, Scouting Fleet, U.S. Fleet, on December 8, 1922. With the change in designations in the Fleet, the destroyers were established as Destroyer Squadron, Scouting Force, U.S. Fleet. From October 1, 1937, to July 3, 1940, units of this squadron were transferred continually to the Pacific Fleet. The outbreak of war in Europe reversed this trend.

On July 3, 1940, there were again enough destroyers in the Atlantic to establish a type command, which became known as Destroyers, Atlantic Squadron, U.S. Fleet. When in November 1940, the Atlantic Squadron became the Patrol Force; the destroyer command was renamed Destroyers, Patrol Force, U.S. Fleet. On February 3, 1941, with the reorganization of the Navy and the dissolution of the Patrol Force; the U.S. Atlantic Fleet formed and Destroyers, Atlantic Fleet came into being.
On 1 April 1962, the Cruiser-Destroyer Force, Atlantic (CruDesLant), was formed by the merger of the former cruiser and destroyer type commands. , the former DesLant flagship, became the CruDesLant flagship. COMCRUDESLANT was originally headquartered at Naval Station Newport, RI, but transferred to Norfolk in the early 1970s.

Previously, Commander, Service Forces, Atlantic Fleet (COMSERVLANT), referred to both the U.S. Navy officer serving in that appointment which was extant from before World War II to 1975, and the command he headed, Service Forces, Atlantic Fleet (SERVLANT). He was the commander of all Atlantic Fleet "service"-type ships, such as oilers, tankers, ammunition ships, reefer ships, cargo ships, supply ships, repair ships, and the like. These ships were non-combatant and were intended only to support the warships as they required supplies. ComServLant was a very large organization during World War II, and its sub-units were termed Service Squadrons (ServRons). From the late 1970s more and more service ships were transferred to Military Sealift Command; for example  was transferred to MSC in January 1980.

Amphibious Forces, Atlantic Fleet (PHIBLANT), came under the command of Rear Admiral Jerauld Wright on November 24, 1948. He held it until November 1, 1950. Based at the Norfolk Naval Station, Wright was responsible for three major subordinate commands, Amphibious Group 2, Amphibious Group 4 (commanded by Eugene B. Fluckey from October 1960 to November 1961) and the Naval Amphibious Base Little Creek. COMPHIBLANT also included Amphibious Training, an Amphibious Air Control Group, a Naval Beach Group, a Detached Group, and a Mediterranean Group. The most significant accomplishment during Wright's tour of duty as COMPHIBLANT was PORTREX, a multi-service amphibious assault exercise held from February 25 to March 11, 1950. PORTREX was the largest peacetime amphibious exercise up to that time and it was staged to evaluate joint doctrine for combined operations, test new equipment under simulated combat conditions and provide training for the defense of the Caribbean. Amphibious Group 4 later took part in operations in the Dominican Republic in 1965.

In April 1994, Commander, Destroyer Squadron 6 (COMDESRON 6) changed homeport to Pascagoula, Mississippi and subsequently was dual hatted as Commander, Naval Surface Group Pascagoula. In January 1996, as a result of an Atlantic Fleet reorganization, Commander, Naval Surface Group Pascagoula was renamed Commander, Regional Support Group Pascagoula.

As part of a reorganization announced in July 1995 of the U.S. Atlantic Fleet's surface combatant ships into six core battle groups, nine destroyer squadrons, and a new Western Hemisphere Group,  was reassigned to Destroyer Squadron 24. The re-organization was to be phased in over the summer and take effect 31 August 1995, with homeport shifts occurring through 1998.

At the end of the transitional period, the following ship assignments were to apply:

Western Hemisphere Group (WESTHEMGRU) was established in September 1995 and eventually supervised Destroyer Squadron 6 and Destroyer Squadron 14 as well as a Coast Guard squadron.(FAS.org, GlobalSecurity.org) It was intended to build expertise on the Caribbean and Central/South America. In April 1998, as the result of yet another reorganization, COMDESRON 6 shifted operational control to Commander, Western Hemisphere Group, and was redesignated as a Tactical Squadron. Around 1998, the squadron included Hall, Ticonderoga, and Yorktown. In December 1999, COMDESRON 6 was redesignated as a Tactical/Readiness Squadron under the operational control of Commander, Naval Surface Group 2. At one point, the composition of Destroyer Squadron 6 included FFG-16 at Mayport, FFG-22 at Charleston, SC,  at Charleston, SC, FFG 15 at Norfolk, and FFG 20 and FFG 21 at Pascagoula.

Commander Naval Surface Group Two was established 18 February 2000 and Western Hemisphere Group was disestablished the same day.

Effective 1 October 2001, the U.S. Navy designated a "Lead-Follow" arrangement among its type commands wherein one type commander was designated the senior lead for the specific "type" of weapon system (i.e., naval aviation, submarine warfare, surface warships) throughout the entire operating U.S. Fleet as it pertains to modernization needs, training initiatives, and operational concept development.  From that date, these designated fleet TYCOM commanders were to provide guidance to their respective "type" forces via the lead-follow TYCOM arrangement.

The Commander, Naval Surface Force, U.S. Pacific Fleet (COMNAVSURFPAC) was designated as the Commander, Naval Surface Forces (COMNAVSURFOR) for the U.S. Fleet Forces Command, with the Commander,  Naval Surface Force Atlantic (COMNAVSURFLANT), serving as his deputy.  COMNAVSURFOR is responsible for modernization needs, training initiatives, and operational concept development for the surface warfare community throughout the U.S. Navy's operational fleet. It appears that as a result, the COMNAVSURFLANT post was lowered to a Rear Admiral's post instead of the previous Vice Admiral.

Force composition in 2010

References

External links
 Official website

Commander, Naval Surface
Type commands of the United States Navy
Military units and formations established in 1975
1975 establishments in the United States
Military history of the Atlantic Ocean